Hugh Jackson may refer to:

Hugh Jackson (golfer) (1940–2015), Irish golfer
Hugh Jackson (Texas politician), member of the Twentieth Texas Legislature
Hugh Jackson (soldier) (died 1779), older brother of American President Andrew Jackson, died during the Battle of Stono Ferry
Hugh Jackson of the Jackson Baronets
Hugh Jackson (physician) (1918–2013), British pediatrician and child safety campaigner

See also
Hue Jackson (born 1965), American football coach
Hugh Jackman, actor